Pronoidae is a family of amphipods belonging to the order Amphipoda.

Genera:
 Eupronoe Claus, 1879
 Paralycaea Claus, 1879
 Parapronoe Claus, 1879
 Pronoe Guérin-Méneville, 1836

References

Amphipoda